Patee Town Historic District is a national historic district located at St. Joseph, Missouri. The district encompasses 71 contributing buildings and 1 contributing site in the Patee Town section of St. Joseph. It developed between about 1858 and 1939, and includes representative examples of Greek Revival and Italianate style architecture. Located in the district are the separately listed Patee House, a hotel that is a U.S. National Historic Landmark, and Jesse James House. Other notable buildings include the Morey Piro House (1910), Charles E. Herycele House (1903), R. L. McDonald Manufacturing Co. Warehouse (1899), Mrs. Pemetia Cornish Duplex (c. 1886), Fred Wenz Store Building (1903), Fire Station #5 (1939), German Salems Church (later, Bne Jacob Synagogue, c. 1880, 1927), and Matthew Ziebold House (1895).

It was listed on the National Register of Historic Places in 2002.

References

Historic districts on the National Register of Historic Places in Missouri
Italianate architecture in Missouri
Greek Revival architecture in Missouri
Historic districts in St. Joseph, Missouri
National Register of Historic Places in Buchanan County, Missouri